Param Vir Chakra is an Indian serial portraying the real life of Param Vir Chakra gallantry award winners, India's highest military honour.

The serial was directed by noted film director Chetan Anand, who previously made war films like Haqeeqat (1964) and Hindustan Ki Kasam (1973). It received critical acclaim when it first aired on Doordarshan channel in 1988. The first episode of the series featured the first recipient of the award, Major Som Nath Sharma of Kumaon Regiment.

List of episodes

See also
 7 RCR (TV Series)
 Samvidhaan (TV Series)
 Satyamev Jayate (TV series)
 Pradhanmantri (TV Series)
 Television shows based on Indian history

References

External links
 

Indian period television series
War television series
Indian historical television series
1988 Indian television series debuts
Indian military television series
1980s Indian television series
DD National original programming